The Durant Educators were a Texas–Oklahoma League baseball team based in Durant, Oklahoma, USA that played during the 1911 season. They were managed by Ben Brownlow, W. W. Washington, Hetty Green and Joe Connor in their only year of existence. The Educators placed 2nd in the league with a 65-46 overall record, hosting home games at the Durant Base Ball Park.

References

Bryan County, Oklahoma
Professional baseball teams in Oklahoma
Baseball teams established in 1911
1911 establishments in Oklahoma
Sports clubs disestablished in 1913
1913 disestablishments in Oklahoma
Defunct minor league baseball teams
Defunct baseball teams in Oklahoma
Baseball teams disestablished in 1913
Texas–Oklahoma League teams